Kim Sang-hyun (Hangul: 김상현, Hanja: 金相賢; born January 18, 1955, in Busan, South Korea) is a former boxer from South Korea.

Career
Kim won the Orient and Pacific Boxing Federation light welterweight title in 1978 and became the WBC light welterweight champion with a technical KO win over Saensak Muangsurin, who set a world record by winning the world title in only his 3rd professional fight. He defended the belt twice before losing it to Saoul Mamby in 1980. In 1981, Kim defeated Thomas Americo to regain the OPBF regional belt. In 1983, Kim unsuccessfully challenged Aaron Pryor for the WBA light welterweight title, losing by TKO at 0:37 of round 3. He retired after the bout.

External links
 

1955 births
Light-welterweight boxers
World Boxing Council champions
Living people
South Korean male boxers
Sportspeople from Busan